Sam Cronin (born December 12, 1986) is an American former soccer player who played as a midfielder.

Club career

College and amateur
Born in Atlanta, Georgia, Cronin attended Mount Tabor High School in Winston-Salem, North Carolina where he moved with his family in 1999. He played college soccer at Wake Forest University, scoring ten goals in twenty-four appearances in 2008, and was one of three finalists for the Hermann Trophy, an award for the best Division I college soccer player. Cronin ultimately finished as second runner-up for the trophy, but won the 2008 Lowe's Senior CLASS Award for Men's Soccer.

During his college years, Cronin also played in the USL Premier Development League for Carolina Dynamo, making thirty-nine appearances in four years, and scoring nine goals.

Professional

Cronin was selected second overall by Major League Soccer team Toronto FC in the 2009 MLS SuperDraft on January 15, 2009. Cronin made his professional debut on 21 March 2009, in Toronto's first game of the 2009 MLS season against Kansas City Wizards. He scored his first professional goal on June 13, 2009 against the New York Red Bulls.

Cronin was traded to San Jose Earthquakes on June 21, 2010 in return for allocation money.

On January 19, 2015, Cronin was traded to Colorado Rapids in exchange for allocation money.  He was selected as a member of the 2015 MLS All-Star Game, coming on at the start of the 2nd half, before being subbed off for Jozy Altidore in the 77th minute.  Cronin served as the Rapids team captain.

On March 31, 2017, Cronin was acquired by Minnesota United FC through the MLS waiver order. Minnesota traded a third-round pick in the 2019 MLS SuperDraft to Chicago Fire to acquire Chicago's #1 pick in the waiver order in order to secure Cronin.

On March 1, 2019, Minnesota bought out the remainder of Cronin's contract.

International career
In June 2009, he received his first call-up by the United States national team for the 2009 CONCACAF Gold Cup. On July 11 Cronin made his debut with the United States against Haiti, lending a hand in the opening goal in the 2–2 draw.

Honors
Wake Forest University
NCAA Men's Division I Soccer Championship: 2007

Toronto FC
Canadian Championship (2): 2009, 2010

San Jose Earthquakes
Supporters' Shield: 2012

Career stats

Last Update: March 30, 2017.

1) Nutrilite Canadian Cup/US Open Cup

2) Concacaf Champions League/Cup

References

External links

1986 births
Living people
Soccer players from Atlanta
Sportspeople from Winston-Salem, North Carolina
American expatriate sportspeople in Canada
American expatriate soccer players
American soccer players
North Carolina Fusion U23 players
Expatriate soccer players in Canada
Association football midfielders
Toronto FC players
San Jose Earthquakes players
Colorado Rapids players
Minnesota United FC players
Soccer players from North Carolina
United States men's international soccer players
USL League Two players
Major League Soccer players
Wake Forest Demon Deacons men's soccer players
2009 CONCACAF Gold Cup players
Toronto FC draft picks
Major League Soccer All-Stars
All-American men's college soccer players